The Men's and Women's Volleyball Competition at the 2003 All-Africa Games were held in Abuja, Nigeria from October 11 to October 18, 2003.

Men's competition

Group A

Group B

Final round
October 17 — Semi Finals

October 18 — Bronze Medal Match

October 18 — Gold Medal Match

Women's competition

Group A

Group B

Final round
October 17 — Semi Finals

October 18 — Bronze Medal Match

October 18 — Gold Medal Match

References

External link
Results

Volleyball at the African Games
A
2003 All-Africa Games